Psychic Today is a satellite-based interactive television channel that offers direct access to psychics, mediums, astrologers & tarot readers. Psychic Today gives its audience direct access to predictions and readings through various means of live participation.

History 
The channel was established in 2004 to respond to viewers’ questions and comments, it was originally launched as Psychic TV but the name had to be withdrawn because of the band of the same name.

In spring 2009, Psychic Television relaunched with a new line-up of interactive shows, which include: Your Dream Psychics and Love Zone. The popular show Psychic Interactive was also relaunched with a new set of on-screen graphics and new music. The channel itself also revealed a new on-screen identity.

2010 saw some changes to Psychic Television, including changes to the psychic & presenter line-up.

On 15 November 2011, Psychic TV was rebranded as Psychic Today.

2018 Psychic Today introduced a mobile version of the website called Mysticcall. This allowed viewers to watch the live show, interact with the Psychics via calls, texts, Instant messaging and to browse the readers profiles. In October 2018 Mysticcall became an official app  that could be downloaded from Google Play or the App Store.

On 11 June 2019, Psychic Today moved to Sky channel 680 as part of the removal of Sky's specialist genre, which coincided with a change in the International genre where its channels were regrouped by primary language.

Original shows featured on Psychic Today 
Good Morning Psychic offers early morning spiritual advice and predictions. Hosted by a presenter and a psychic, the programme tackles topics and themes related to the psychic world. Across all the shows, the viewers have three key ways of interacting; phoning, texting or leaving a caller comment. Good Morning Psychic gives the opportunity to receive a complimentary reading whilst providing a start to the day.

Psychic Interactive launched in 2004 on the Game Network as the first interactive psychic show in Britain. It is Psychic Today’s original format and the channel’s flagship show. The programme features two psychics and one presenter as the hosts (subject to change). Viewers are able to directly contact the programme in much the same way as Good Morning Psychic. A variety of topics and subjects are addressed, giving the viewer influence over the direction of the live show. Psychic Interactive broadcast on the Game Network.

Psychic Today current format  as at June 2019 consists of a daytime show commencing at 10am UK time. At  15.30 hours the show is produced live in the studio and runs through to midnight daily. At 22.00 hours, the show changes to the After Hours Show which is streamed on social media such as Facebook and Youtube.

Psychics who appear on Psychic Today 
Regular psychics appearing on the new shows include:

 James Higgins
 India Jo
 Clair Merryweather
 Raphaël Pathé

Regular presenters include:
 Ophelia Dennis
 Paul Miles
 Adele Vellacott
 Richard Oliver

References

External links 
 
 

Psychics
Television channels in the United Kingdom
Cellcast